Kalfou Danjere is an album by the Haitian band Boukman Eksperyans, released in 1992. The title track, which translates to "Dangerous Crossroads", was banned in Haiti for its alleged subversive qualities. "Nwel Inosan" was also banned.

The album peaked at No. 1 on Billboard'''s World Albums chart.

Production
The album was produced by Eric Clermontet. It was recorded at Audiotek Studios, in Port-au-Prince, Haiti, with some work accomplished at Studio Center in the United States. Founder Lolo Beaubrun and his anthropologist wife traveled around Haiti to study the music of lakous, or hamlets; "Kalfou Danjere" incorporated four different rhythms picked up from lakous.

Critical receptionEntertainment Weekly wrote that the band "weds roots rhythms to fierce electric rock, and whose gentle, metaphorical lyrics have the power to make a dictator sweat bullets." Robert Christgau praised "Zansèt Nou Yo". The New York Times deemed the songs "vigorous pop with an undercurrent of voodoo drumming."Rolling Stone called the album "rich with traditional Afro-Haitian drumming, cross-stitched with edgy electric guitar and synthesizer patterns and ringing with the voice of defiance." The Chicago Tribune stated: "Drawing on the traditional, percussive, festival music called rara and older vodoun forms, Boukman has fashioned a fresh new sound that celebrates Haiti's rich African rhythmic and cultural roots." The Sun-Sentinel'' considered the album a "melodically compelling and lyrically rich effort."

Track listing

References

1992 albums
Mango Records albums
Albums by Haitian artists